Svetlana Yurievna Soluianova (born 21 September 1994) is a Russian boxer. She competed in the women's flyweight event at the 2020 Summer Olympics.

References

External links
 

1994 births
Living people
Russian women boxers
Olympic boxers of Russia
Boxers at the 2020 Summer Olympics
People from Dimitrovgrad, Russia
Boxers at the 2019 European Games
European Games medalists in boxing
European Games silver medalists for Russia
Sportspeople from Ulyanovsk Oblast